Thomas Allofs (born 17 November 1959) is a German former professional footballer who played as a striker.

The younger brother of another footballer, Klaus Allofs, he was a prolific goalscorer, scoring nearly 200 overall goals as a professional, always playing in the Bundesliga (a brief spell in France notwithstanding).

Allofs represented West Germany at the 1982 World Cup.

Club career
Born in Düsseldorf, Allofs started his professional career aged 19, netting five goals in 17 contests with local giants Fortuna Düsseldorf. In his first year, he combined with sibling Klaus for 29 team goals (out of 70, league's third-best), as Fortuna finished seventh; he also played in five matches in the club's UEFA Cup Winners' Cup runner-up run, including the extra time final loss against FC Barcelona.

In 1982, Allofs joined 1. FC Kaiserslautern, where he proceeded to score at an impressive rate (an average of 15 per season), although the team did not win any silverware. Subsequently, he moved to 1. FC Köln, rejoining with his brother in 1986–87, and being crowned the league's top scorer in his third season, with the team finishing second.

Allofs wrapped up his career in 1992 at his first club, after an unassuming five-month stint in France with RC Strasbourg in the 1989–90 season. He stayed connected with Fortuna as a director.

International career
Allofs was an uncapped (an unused) member for West Germany in the 1982 FIFA World Cup campaign, which ended with runner-up honours. He would receive two caps during three years, the first coming on 16 October 1985 in a 1–0 defeat in Stuttgart against Portugal in a 1986 World Cup qualifier.

Honours
Fortuna Düsseldorf
 DFB-Pokal: 1978–79, 1979–80
 UEFA Cup Winners' Cup runner-up: 1978–79

West Germany
FIFA World Cup: runner-up 1982

Individual
Bundesliga top scorer: 1988–89
kicker Bundesliga Team of the Season: 1990–91

References

External links
 
 
 
 Thomas Allofs Fussballschule 

1959 births
Living people
Footballers from Düsseldorf
German footballers
West German footballers
Association football forwards
Bundesliga players
Fortuna Düsseldorf players
1. FC Kaiserslautern players
1. FC Köln players
Ligue 1 players
RC Strasbourg Alsace players
Germany international footballers
Germany B international footballers
Germany under-21 international footballers
1982 FIFA World Cup players
West German expatriate footballers
Expatriate footballers in France
Kicker-Torjägerkanone Award winners
West German expatriate sportspeople in France